Balogh is a Hungarian surname of nobility, a variant of Balog, see article Balog (genus). Notable people with the surname include:

Ádám Balogh, one of the most famous kuruc colonels during Rákóczi's War for Independence
Béla Balogh, a Hungarian football (soccer) player
Brian Balogh, an American historian 
Ernő Balogh, a Hungarian-born and -trained classical pianist
Fritz Balogh, a German football (soccer) player
János Balogh (disambiguation), multiple people
József Balogh (disambiguation), multiple people
Kálmán Balogh, a Hungarian cimbalom player
László Balogh (painter), Hungarian painter
László Balogh (sport shooter) (born 1958), Hungarian former sport shooter
Mary Balogh, a Welsh-Canadian novelist
Norbert Balogh, Hungarian footballer 
Steve Balogh, a member of the Canadian rock band Pink Mountaintops
Suzanne Balogh, an Australian gold medalist in Shooting at the 2004 Summer Olympics - Women's trap
Thomas Balogh, Baron Balogh, a Hungarian economist and member of the English House of Lords
Zoltán Tibor Balogh, a Hungarian mathematician

See also
 Balogh Defense, a chess gambit named for Janos Balogh

Hungarian-language surnames